Nyaminyami FM is a provincial commercial radio station broadcasting from 438 Heights Drive, Kariba, Zimbabwe in 3 main languages namely Tonga, Korekore and Shona.

The station hosts one of the country's biggest annual events, the NyamiNyami Lakeside Festival, which attracts more than 50 000 people in October.

References

External links

Radio stations in Zimbabwe
Radio stations established in 2016
2016 establishments in Zimbabwe